TDB may refer to:

 Barycentric Dynamical Time (Temps Dynamique Barycentrique), a time standard
 The Daily Beast, a news site
 The Daily Buzz
 The Division Bell, a Pink Floyd album
 Trade and Development Bank, a multilateral African development financial institution 
 Trade Development Bank, a former Geneva-based bank, now defunct
 Trivial Database, database engine
 United Nations Conference on Trade and Development (UNCTAD)'s Trade and Development Board
 TDB, An Australian HipHop Artist